Good breeding may refer to:

Purebred, "cultivated varieties" of a species
Etiquette, the socially reinforced standards of conduct which show the actor to be cultured, polite, and refined
Eugenics, a social philosophy which advocates the improvement of human hereditary traits through various forms of intervention